Ishgeh Su (also Romanized as Īshgeh Sū) is a village in Qarah Quyun-e Jonubi Rural District, Qarah Quyun District, Showt County, West Azerbaijan Province, Iran. At the 2006 census, its population was 94, in 19 families.

References 

Populated places in Showt County